In human–computer interaction, simultaneous editing is an end-user development technique allowing a user to make multiple simultaneous edits of text in a multiple selection at once through direct manipulation.

Multiple selections and cursors are typically created by using a keyboard shortcut to select repeated instances of the same text or text fragments surrounded by the same delimiters, by using a search feature to select all instances of a search term, by selecting the same column in multiple lines, or by selecting text or cursor positions with a mouse. The Lapis experimental web browser and text editor is also able to infer selections based on concept learning from positive and negative examples given by the user during a process known as selection guessing.

Tools for data wrangling (mass reformatting) also sometimes include commands for simultaneous editing of all data in a column or category.

Editors supporting simultaneous editing
 Simultaneous editing in Lapis
 Multiple selections in Sublime Text
 Multiple cursors in Cloud9
 Multi-cursor package in Atom
 Multiple selections in Visual Studio Code
 Multiple selections in Firefox developer tools
 Multiple-cursors in Emacs
 Multi Edit plug-in for gedit
 Multi-Editing Settings in Notepad++
 Multiple carets in PyCharm
 Column Edit Mode in Vi and Vi derivatives such as  Vim

See also 
 Batch renaming

References 

Copy-and-Paste between Overlapping Windows by Olivier Chapuis, Nicolas Roussel. In Proceedings of CHI'07. "Other systems have been proposed to support fast copy-paste of multiple selections or text entities like phone numbers"
 Citeseer
 LAPIS: Smart Editing with Text Structure introductory article.
 Lightweight Structured Text Processing, an extended description
 Robert C. Miller, Brad A. Myers: Multiple selections in smart text editing. 103–110, IUI 2002, Proceedings of the 2002 International Conference on Intelligent User Interfaces, January 13–16, 2002, San Francisco, California, USA. ACM, 2002, 

User interface techniques
Text editor features